Remnants of a Deeper Purity is the sixth studio album by the darkwave band Black Tape for a Blue Girl. It was released on June 7, 1996, by Projekt Records. A cassette version was released in 1997 on Poland's Black Flames Productions. In 2007, a 10th-anniversary edition of the album was released, with a bonus disc, including the With My Sorrows EP from the same era.

Black Tape for a Blue Girl's Sam Rosenthal described the album as "an album of rebirth – the internal analysis and exploration that paves the way for a major upheaval."

Critical reception

AllMusic critic Ned Raggett wrote that Remnants of a Deeper Purity "succeeds like no other Black Tape release before it, the logical extension of Rosenthal's musical and lyrical foci into a lengthy, commanding, and beautiful experience." He ranked it at number 93 on his list of the best albums of the 1990s for Freaky Trigger.

Track listing

References

Black Tape for a Blue Girl albums
Projekt Records albums
1996 albums